KK Kvarner history and statistics in FIBA Europe and Euroleague Basketball (company) competitions.

European competitions

Record
KK Kvarner has overall, from 1977–78 (first participation) to 2001–02 (last participation): 6 wins against 11 defeats and 1 draw in 18 games for all the European club competitions.

 EuroLeague: –
 FIBA Saporta Cup: 2–6 in 8 games
 FIBA Korać Cup: 4–5 plus 1 draw in 10 games

References

External links
FIBA Europe

Yugoslav basketball clubs in European and worldwide competitions
Basketball teams in Croatia